The petroleum industry in Russia is one of the largest in the world. Russia has the largest reserves and is the largest exporter of natural gas. It has the second largest coal reserves, the sixth largest oil reserves, and is one of the largest producers of oil. It is the fourth largest energy user.

In 2009, it produced 12% of the world's oil and had a similar share of global oil exports. It is also the main transit country for oil from Kazakhstan.

Russia is by far the world's largest natural gas exporter. Most, but not all, authorities believe that Russia has the world's largest proven reserves of natural gas. Sources indicating Russia to have the largest proven reserves include the US CIA (47.6 trillion cubic meters), the US Energy Information Administration (47.8 tcm), and OPEC (48.7 tcm). However, BP credits Russia with only 31.3 tcm as of 1 January 2014, which would place it in second place, slightly behind Iran (33.1 to 33.8 tcm, depending on the source). In addition to having the world's largest proven reserves of natural gas, according to US Geological Survey estimations, Russia is also likely to have the world's largest volume of still-undiscovered natural gas: a mean probable volume of 6.7 trillion cubic meters. The USGS estimate of Russia's undiscovered oil is 22 billion barrels, second in the world only to those of Iraq.

Investment and sanctions
As of 2008, the Russian oil industry claims to be in need of huge investments. Strong growth in the Russian economy means that local demand for all types of energy sources (oil, gas, nuclear, coal, hydro, electricity) continues to grow.

The 2022 Russian invasion of Ukraine resulted in sanctions imposed by the USA, the EU and other nations, to forbid or reduce the importation of Gas, Oil and associated products from Russia, including the introduction of a novel price cap on shipped oil, designed to allow Russia to maintain production but limiting the revenue from oil sales. From 5 December 2022 the price cap is set at USD60 pb.

Russia's oil and gas companies
The biggest Russian oil company is Rosneft followed by Lukoil, Surgutneftegaz, Gazprom Neft and Tatneft. All oil trunk pipelines (except Caspian Pipeline Consortium) are owned and operated by the state-owned monopoly Transneft and oil products pipeline are owned and operated by its subsidiary Transnefteproduct.

Gazprom (Russia's state-run natural gas monopoly; world's biggest gas exploration and production company)
Lukoil 
Rosneft (State-owned Russian oil and gas exploration company)
Surgutneftegas
Tatneft
Northgas
Transneft (Russia's pipeline monopoly)
Bashneft (Russian oil refining company one of the largest producer of oil products in the country)
Russneft
Itera
Novatek
Rusneftegaz

Academic institutions
 Gubkin Russian State University of Oil and Gas (Moscow)
 Saint Petersburg Mining Institute -Oil and Gas Department (Saint Petersburg)
 Siberian Research Institute of Petroleum Industry (SibNIINP)
 Russia Petroleum Research Exploration Institute (VNIGRI) of Ministry of Natural Resources and Ecology of the Russian Federation and the Russian Academy of Sciences (RAN).
 Tyumen State Oil and Gas University Tyumen)
 Ufa State Petroleum Technological University
 Almetyevsk State Petroleum Institute (Almetyevsk)
 Irkutsk National Research Technical University (Irkutsk)

See also

Economy of Russia
Energy in Russia
Energy policy of Russia
Oil reserves in Russia
Russia in the European energy sector
Global warming in Russia
Energy policy of the Soviet Union
2022 Russian oil price cap

References

External links

All Russian oil companies on Russian Business Map MXKR.ru.
Country Analysis: Russia's Oil and Natural Gas.
"Major Russian Companies: Some Details" (1995-1996), Joint Project by Expert Magazine and Menatep Bank, undated.
"Russia's oil renaissance," BBC, 24 June 2002.
History of Oil in Russia, Sibneft, 2003.
"The Oil and Gas Industry": 1999-2000 and 2000-2004, Kommersant, 23 October 2001 and 17 May 2004.
David Correll, "Russia: the new oil giant. An industry perspective," AMEC, July 2004.